Mende  (Mɛnde yia) is a major language of Sierra Leone, with some speakers in neighboring Liberia and Guinea. It is spoken by the Mende people and by other ethnic groups as a regional lingua franca in southern Sierra Leone. In southern Sierra Leone, it is the regional lingua franca that allows all tribes to communicate. (PREVIOUS SENTENCE IS WRONG. KRIO IS THE LINGUA FRANCA FOR ALL SIERRA LEONE AND MENDE IS THE LANGUAGE OF THE SOUTH. EVEN THE SHERBROS IN THE SOUTH SPEAK MENDE AS THEIR FIRST OR SECOND LANGUAGE). 

Mende is a tonal language belonging to the Mande language family. Early systematic descriptions of Mende were by F. W. Migeod and Kenneth Crosby.

Written forms

In 1921, Kisimi Kamara invented a syllabary for Mende he called Kikakui (𞠂𞠁𞠀 / ).  The script achieved widespread use for a time, but has largely been replaced with an alphabet based on the Latin script, and the Mende script is considered a "failed script". The Bible was translated into Mende and published in 1959, in Latin script.

The Latin-based alphabet is: a, b, d, e, ɛ, f, g, gb, h, i, j, k, kp, l, m, n, ny, o, ɔ, p, s, t, u, v, w, y. 

Mende has seven vowels: a, e, ɛ, i, o, ɔ, u.

Phonology

Consonants

Vowels

In films

Mende was used extensively in the films Amistad and Blood Diamond and was the subject of the documentary film The Language You Cry In.

Sample text 
Numuvuisia Kpɛlɛɛ ta ti le tɛ yɛ nduwɔ ya hu, tao ti nuvuu yei kɛɛ ti lɔnyi maa hɛwungɔ. Kiiya kɛɛ hindaluahu gɔɔla a yɛlɔ ti hun. Fale mahoungɔ ti ti nyɔnyɔhu hoi kia ndeegaa.

Translation 
All human beings are born free and equal in dignity and rights. They are endowed with reason and conscience and should act towards one another in a spirit of brotherhood.

(Article 1 of the Universal Declaration of Human Rights)

References

External links 
Bibliography on Mende
The Mende syllabary (Omniglot)
PanAfrican L10n page on Mende, Bandi & Loko
Portions of the Book of Common Prayer in Mende (1916)
OLAC resources in and about the Mende language

 
Mande languages
Languages of Sierra Leone
Languages of Liberia
Mende people